Cup-tie Honeymoon was the first motion picture to be filmed at the Dickenson Road Studios by the Mancunian Film Corporation in 1948, themed around football.

Plot summary

A business man's son (Powell) has to choose between playing for his father's team and their rivals in a football match. He does the right thing and romantically impresses his father's secretary.

Cast
 Sandy Powell as Joe Butler 
 Dan Young as Cecil Alistair 
 Betty Jumel as Betty 
 Pat McGrath as Eric Chambers 
 Violet Farebrother as Mary Chambers 
 Frank Groves as Jimmy Owen 
 Joyanne Bracewell as Pauline May 
 Vic Arnley as Grandad 
 Harold Walden as himself
 Barry K. Barnes as Grumpy customer  
 Pat Phoenix as Mrs. Butler (credited as Patricia Pilkington)
 Bernard Youens as Coalman (uncredited)
 David Edwin Vivian Coker Callan as Policeman

Production
Filmed in Rusholme, Manchester, much of the shooting took place on local streets and at the nearby Maine Road stadium.

Cultural impact
Release of the film coincided with the start of the 1948 football season.

References

External links
All Mancunian Films described here

1948 films
British association football films
1940s sports films
British black-and-white films
Films shot in Greater Manchester
1940s English-language films
1940s British films